Aspergillus bisporus is a species of fungus in the genus Aspergillus. It is from the Bispori section. The species was first described in 1971.

The genome of A. bisporus was sequenced as a part of the Aspergillus whole-genome sequencing project - a project dedicated to performing whole-genome sequencing of all members of the genus Aspergillus. The genome assembly size was 27.10 Mbp.

Growth and morphology

Aspergillus bisporus has been cultivated on both Czapek yeast extract agar (CYA) plates and Malt Extract Agar Oxoid® (MEAOX) plates. The growth morphology of the colonies can be seen in the pictures below.

References 

bisporus
Fungi described in 1971